Naeem Baig (born 1952) is a Pakistani short story writer. He has written short stories (afsanas) in Urdu and has published a collection of short stories and essays titled You, Damn Sala. He has spent most of the time of his life working overseas. He is author of the novel Kogon Plan.

Publications
 You, Damn Sala is a collection of 13 short stories and essays.
 Kogon Plan is a spy novel.

References

https://aikrozan.com/author/naeem

https://goodreads.com/author/show/16175631.Naeem_Baig

Living people
Pakistani writers
1952 births